Excimer laser trabeculostomy (ELT) is a procedure to create holes in the trabecular meshwork to reduce intraocular pressure. It uses a XeCl 308 nm excimer laser. It is considered a minimally invasive glaucoma surgeries, and was described in 1987 by Dr. Michael Berlin.

References

Eye surgery